Lydia Charity Schatz (March 15, 2002 – February 6, 2010) was a 7-year-old American child of Liberian origins who was killed in 2010 by her adoptive parents in an attempt to discipline her.

Background 
Kevin and Elizabeth Schatz lived in Paradise, California, where they were raising and homeschooling their six biological and three adopted children. In 2007, they had adopted Lydia along with two other children from Liberia. Later that year, Kevin was interviewed in the family home by KNVN TV regarding his love of children and the adoption process.

Murder 
On February 5, 2010, Lydia Schatz received forceful and numerous whippings with a quarter-inch plastic tubing. She was held down for nine hours by Elizabeth and beaten dozens of times by Kevin on the back of her body, causing massive tissue damage according to Butte County District Attorney Mike Ramsey. She was being disciplined for apparently mispronouncing a word. She died in the hospital on February 6, 2010. Her sister, Zariah, 11 years old, was also beaten for "being a liar and a bad influence on the 7 year old." Zariah was hospitalized in critical condition with severe injuries, but she survived.

Trial 
The Schatzes told police they were following the teachings about child discipline of a fundamentalist Christian organization headed by Michael and Debi Pearl. Investigators say the Schatzes practiced a similar form of corporal punishment on their six biological children and were training their oldest daughter in the proper way to deliver spankings. Pearl's website, www.nogreaterjoy.org, suggests "A swift whack with the plastic tubing would sting but not bruise. Give ten licks at a time, more if the child resists."

Kevin Schatz was found guilty of second degree murder and torture and was sentenced to serve at least 22 years of imprisonment from two life sentences. Elizabeth Schatz was found guilty of voluntary manslaughter and infliction of unlawful corporal punishment and was sentenced to serve at least 13 years of imprisonment.

See also
Adoption in the United States
Child discipline
Corporal punishment
Corporal punishment in the home
Domestic violence
List of murdered American children

References

2002 births
2010 deaths
American people of Liberian descent
2010 murders in the United States
Child abuse resulting in death
Deaths by person in California
Murdered American children
American torture victims
Whipping
Crimes in California
2010 in California
Incidents of violence against girls
February 2010 crimes in the United States